Sander Arends and Antonio Šančić were the defending champions but only Arends chose to defend his title, partnering Romain Arneodo. Arends lost in the quarterfinals to Simone Bolelli and Daniele Bracciali.

Sander Gillé and Joran Vliegen won the title after defeating Leander Paes and Miguel Ángel Reyes-Varela 3–6, 6–4, [10–2] in the final.

Seeds

Draw

References
 Main Draw

Brest Challenger - Doubles